Monti Reatini is a mountain range in the central Apennines, Italy.The highest peak is the Monte Terminillo (2217 m), home to ski resorts and a favorite destination of tourism

References 

Reatini
Mountain ranges of Italy